Jacob Symonsz. Pynas (1592, Haarlem – 1650, Delft), was a Dutch Golden Age painter.

Biography
According to Houbraken, Rembrandt studied with him in his workshop a few months after his six-month apprenticeship with Pieter Lastman, before he opened his own workshop in Leiden.

According to the RKD he was the brother of Jan Pynas who travelled to Italy.  Their sister Meynsge married the artist Jan Tengnagel in 1611. Though Jacob is known for scenes of Italy, these paintings could have been based on sketches brought back by his brother Jan and it is not certain that Jacob travelled to Italy. He influenced Rembrandt and became a member of the Delft Guild of St. Luke in the years 1632-1639. He became the teacher of Bartholomeus Breenberg.

The Pynas brothers were grouped within Dutch artists called the Pre-Rembrandtists. Their work is close in style to the painter Adam Elsheimer, and there has been a history of mis-attribution between the three, where the Pynas brothers are known to have signed their works "J. Pynas."

Jan died in Amsterdam; Jacob survived him by many years and is thought to have died in Delft.

Selected works
1618 - Mercury and Herse, Oil on Copper, (Uffizi Gallery, Florence) 
1618 - Landscape with Mercury and Battus, Oil on Canvas, (Wiener collection, New York)
1628 - Mountain Landscape with Narcissus, Oil on Wood, (National Gallery, London) 
17th century - Paul and Barnabas at Lystra, Oil on Wood, (Metropolitan Museum of Art, New York City)
17th century - Sacrifice of Isaac, Pen, ink and watercolour on paper, (Courtauld Institute of Art, London)
17th century - Sacrifice of Gideon, Watercolour and chalk on paper, (Courtauld Institute of Art, London) 
17th century - Christ and the lawyer, Chalk on paper, (Courtauld Institute of Art, London)
17th century - Apollo and Daphne, Pen and Ink on paper, (Courtauld Institute of Art, London)
17th century - The Good Samaritan, Oil on Copper, (Louvre, Paris) du Musée Jeanne d'Aboville de La Fère, dans l'Aisne.
17th century - The Flight into Egypt, Oil, (Louvre, Paris)
17th century - The Canaanite woman kissing the bottom of Jesus's robe, drawing, (Louvre, Paris)
17th century - Landscape with Juno, Minerva, Venus, Paris and Cupid'', Ink drawing, (Louvre, Paris)

References

External links
Works at WGA
Jacob Pynas at PubHist
Jacob Symonsz. Pynas on Artnet

Dutch Golden Age painters
Dutch male painters
1592 births
1650 deaths
Painters from Delft
Artists from Haarlem